Coleophora pandionella is a moth of the family Coleophoridae. It is found in Russia and China.

References

pandionella
Moths described in 1988
Moths of Asia